Bertrand Marcel Laquait (born 13 April 1977) is a French retired professional footballer who played as a goalkeeper.

Club career
Born in Vichy, Laquait started his professional career with AS Nancy in Ligue 2, appearing in only two matches in his first year in a final promotion to Ligue 1 and adding five the next season. He was first-choice the following two campaigns, the last one spent in the second division.

In summer 2002, Laquait joined R. Charleroi S.C. in Belgium, starting for the Zèbres from his second season onwards. On 21 December 2003 he scored from his goal against R.A.E.C. Mons, and was nominated for the campaign's Belgian Goalkeeper of the Year award, eventually losing to Silvio Proto of R.A.A. Louviéroise.

Laquait spent 2006–07 on loan to Recreativo de Huelva in Spain, making his La Liga debut on 14 October 2006 in a 1–2 away loss against Atlético Madrid (45 minutes played). He played understudy to Javier López Vallejo during the season, and failed to appear in the league for Charleroi upon his return, leaving the club in June 2009.

Aged 32, Laquait returned to his country and signed for Thonon Évian F.C. of Championnat National, being first-choice as the team achieved two consecutive promotions. On 1 October 2011 he played his first match in the top flight in more than 11 years, a 1–1 draw at his first professional team Nancy where he was named player of the match.

References

External links

Stats at Voetbal International 

1977 births
Living people
People from Vichy
Sportspeople from Allier
French footballers
Association football goalkeepers
Ligue 1 players
Ligue 2 players
Championnat National players
AS Nancy Lorraine players
Thonon Evian Grand Genève F.C. players
Valenciennes FC players
Belgian Pro League players
R. Charleroi S.C. players
La Liga players
Recreativo de Huelva players
French expatriate footballers
Expatriate footballers in Belgium
Expatriate footballers in Spain
French expatriate sportspeople in Belgium
French expatriate sportspeople in Spain
Footballers from Auvergne-Rhône-Alpes